The swimming competition at the 2001 Goodwill Games was held in Brisbane, Australia at the Sleeman Centre (Brisbane) from 29 August to 3 September.

Men's events

References
 2001 Goodwill Games Swimming Results 

2001 Goodwill Games
2001
2001 in swimming
Swimming competitions in Australia